Mark Loves Sharon was a six-part Australian television mockumentary parody series about sport, celebrities and reality television.

The series sees Jason Gann reprising his role of Mark Wary from The Wedge, a professional Sports star, that is a parody of controversial real-life sport stars Shane Warne and Wayne Carey. Dailan Evans also reprises his role as his long-suffering manager Jerry.

The theme song of the show is Little by Little by Chasing Bailey.

Cast

References

External links
Mark Loves Sharon - Official Website

Network 10 original programming
Australian comedy television series
2008 Australian television series debuts
2008 Australian television series endings
Australian mockumentary television series
Television shows set in Victoria (Australia)